Synaptobrevin homolog YKT6 is a protein that in humans is encoded by the YKT6 gene.

Function 

This gene product is one of the SNARE recognition molecules implicated in vesicular transport between secretory compartments. It is a membrane associated, isoprenylated protein that functions at the endoplasmic reticulum-Golgi transport step. This protein is highly conserved from yeast to human and can functionally complement the loss of the yeast homolog in the yeast secretory pathway.

Interactions 

YKT6 has been shown to interact with BET1L.

References

Further reading